The Indian electronics industry saw growth in the early years of the 21st century, encouraged both by government policies and incentives and by international investment. Its key and most resource-intensive segment, the semiconductor industry benefitted from domestic demand growing briskly. Semiconductors were required by a large number of industries, including telecommunications, information technology, industrial machinery and automation, medical electronics, automobile, engineering, power and solar photovoltaic, defense and aerospace, consumer electronics, and appliances. As of 2015, however, the skill gap in the Indian industry threatened progress, with 65 to 70 percent of the market relying on imports.

Electronics industry

Statistics and trends

Market-size
India's electronics market, one of the largest in the world in terms of consumption, has grown to  USD 400 billion by 2020 from USD 69.6 billion in 2012, largely led by an up-surge in demand, growing at a projected compound annual growth rate of close to 25% over the period.

In 2013-14, 65% of demand for electronic products was met through imports. According to a Frost & Sullivan-IESA data analysis, five high priority product categories together account for 60% of the overall electronic consumption.  In descending order, these are mobile phones (38.85%), flat panel display television (7.91%), notebooks (5.54%) and desktops (4.39℅).
India’s appliance and the consumer electronics market, which was worth USD 9.7 billion in 2014, is predicted to grow at a compound annual rate of 13.4%, and reach USD 20.6 billion by 2020. Within consumer electronics segment, set-top boxes are seen as the fastest growing category, with Y-o-Y growth predicted to be 28.8℅ between 2014-2020, followed by the television category at 20%, refrigerators at 10%, washing machines at 8-9% and air-conditioners at around 6-7%.

In 2013, demand for IT electronics in India was estimated to be valued at around USD 13 billion.

The market opportunity for aerospace and defence (A&D) electronics in India is predicted to be worth upwards of  USD 70 billion by 2029-2030, of which around USD 55 billion may be generated from electronics which are part of the platforms to be procured and rest from system-of-system projects.

Domestic production
The total domestic productions of electronic goods during 2012-13, 2013–14 and 2014–15 were  164,172 crores,  180,454 crores and  190,366 crores, respectively.
The electronics hardware manufacturing industry in India is projected to produce electronic goods worth USD 104 billion by 2020 from USD 32.46 billion in 2013–14. In FY13, India's share in global electronics hardware production was 1.6%. The communication and broadcasting equipment segment constituted 31℅, thereby having a dominant share in the total production of electronic goods in India in FY13, followed by consumer electronics at 23℅.
Of the smartphones shipped in the country in the April–June quarter of 2015, 24.8% were either manufactured or assembled in India, up from 19.9% in the previous quarter.
Of the 220 million mobile sets shipped in India in 2015-16, around 110 million mobile phones have been either made or assembled in India in the last year, compared to 60 million earlier. Mobile handset manufacturing in 2015-16 grew by 185℅ in value terms to  54,000 crores from  19,000 crores in the previous year. According to an
ASSOCHAM-EY study titled  Turning the Make in India dream into a reality for electronics and hardware industry , the Indian electronics and hardware industry was expected to grow at a CAGR of 13%–16% in 2013–18 to reach USD 112–130 billion by 2018 from a 2016 level of USD 75 billion.
According to a report of the NITI Aayog published in May 2016, the electronics industry's contribution to GDP is only 1.7% in India, compared to 15.5% in Taiwan, 15.1% in South Korea and 12.7% in China. Currently, India accounts for less than 5% of the global EMS market and a large part of India’s electronics manufacturing caters to its domestic market.

In 2014, the level of localized input/value addition for televisions was around 25-30% as the panels, semiconductors and the glass needed for manufacturing LCD/LED TVs had to be imported. For air-conditioners, localization was about 30-40% as the compressor, refrigerant, motor and coil were imported. About 35-40% of components for set-top boxes were sourced domestically. The localized content for washing machines and refrigerators was at around 70%.

In mobile phone assembly in India, only 2-8℅ localized value addition is reported to be created in 2016.

In the Defence sector, there is the Opto Electronics Factory (OLF), Dehradun of the Ordnance Factory Board, the one-of-its-kind in India manufacturing opto-electronic products for defence use.

Exports and imports
India is a net importer of electronics goods, with the majority of India's imported electronics coming from China. In 2015, electronics overtook gold and is placed immediately after crude oil as the second most valued category of imports to the country. In 2019, Prof Vikram Kumar, emeritus professor in physics at IIT Delhi revealed that India is spending more money on the import of semiconductors than on oil.

Exports
Electronics exports from India were estimated to be around $7.66 billion in FY13, a slight decline from $8.15  billion in FY12, although in INR terms, they grew from 44000 crore rupees to 46300 crore rupees in the same period, owing to the depreciation of the rupee. The telecom segment dominated India's electronics exports in 2013–14, followed by electronic components, instruments, consumer electronics, and computing. Technological improvements and competitive cost-effectiveness are thought to be the key drivers behind the growing demand for Indian electronics products abroad. In rupee terms, Indian electronic hardware exports almost doubled from 109940 crores in 2009-10 to 196103 crore in 2013–14.
In FY14, India's electronics exports declined to $6 billion, forming 0.28% of the global electronics trade.

Imports
The total imports of electronic goods during 2012-13, 2013–14, and 2014–15, were estimated to be worth  1,79,000 crore (US$28 billion),  1,95,900 crore (US$31 billion) and  2,25,600 crore (US$37 billion) respectively.  The importation of phones has increased sharply from $665.47 million in 2003-04 to $10.9 billion in 2013-14, according to the commerce ministry data. The import of phones from China has grown from $64.61 million to $7 billion during the same period. In 2013-14, India's electronics trade deficit was valued at US$23.5 billion, of which China accounted for 67℅.  
From around $28 billion in FY11, the importation of electronics could reach $40 billion in FY16.   , local manufacturing of electronics has risen, beginning a turnaround at a time when Indian exports have been relatively weak.  In January 2016, electronic imports, which accounted for 27% of India's yearly trade deficit, shrank by 2.2% to $3.2 billion, while electronic exports rose 7.8% to $0.5 billion.

Government initiatives
To promote overall growth and open job opportunities, projected to be more than 28 million by attracting investments worth $100 billion, the Indian central government has sought to reduce the country's electronics import bill from 65% in 2014–15 to 50% in 2016 and gradually to a net-zero electronics trade by 2020.  India has pursued a two-pronged strategy of import substitution and export encouragement, through the Make in India campaign coupled with the Digital India campaign, the Startup India and the Skill India campaigns. The government has fostered an environment conducive to foreign direct investment (FDI) inflow in several ways, as outlined in the National Electronics Policy and the National Telecom Policy.

Increased liberalisation of Foreign Direct Investment (FDI): 100% FDI through an automatic route.
Relaxation of tariffs.
Establishment of Electronic Hardware Technology Parks (EHTPs) and Special Economic Zones (SEZs).
Implementation of Preferential Market Access (PMA).
Imposing basic customs duties on certain items falling outside the framework of the IT free trade agreement.
Exempting import-dependent inputs/components for PC manufacturing from a Special Additional Duty (SAD).
Incentivising the export of certain electronics goods in the Focus Products scheme under the Foreign Trade Policy.
Funding 3000 PhD students in electronics and IT across the Indian universities.
Imposing an education cess on imported electronic products for parity.
To offer incentives of up to $1.7 billion by 2020 to electronics hardware manufacturing entities setting up shops in India to help offset the disadvantages of developing the new industry in the country, a Modified Special Incentive Package Scheme (MSIPS) has been initiated. The government has approved 40 proposals worth over INR9538 crore between January 2014 and June 2015 under the scheme.
The establishment of greenfield and brownfield Electronic Manufacturing Clusters (EMCs) is encouraged under the EMC scheme. Some 200 EMCs are projected by 2020, of which 30 are already in the process of establishment.

The National Institution for Transforming India (NITI Aayog), a policy think-tank under the Indian central government, has suggested in a draft report that a policy be adopted to provide a tax holiday for ten years to firms investing US$1 billion or more that also create 20,000 jobs. The report, hinting at a policy tilt toward the Information Technology Agreement-2 (ITA -2), also suggests that India should re-strategize its defensive policies regarding Free Trade agreements (FTAs) and aggressively pursue export-oriented policies to utilize these FTAs as opportunities to obtain duty-free access to the electronics markets of its FTA partners.

Investments in the electronics sector
The electronics sector in India attracted foreign direct investment or FDI (equity capital component only, and after excluding the amount remitted through Reserve Bank of India's NRI schemes) worth $1.636 billion between April 2000 and March 2016, which was 0.57% of the cumulative FDI equity inflow worth $288.51 billion the country received in the same period.

, the government has received 156 proposals with investment commitments worth INR1.14 lakh crore or $16.8 billion in the previous 20 months, according to the India Electronics and Semiconductor Association (IESA), an organisation that promotes local manufacture of computer hardware and electronic goods in India.

As of June 2016, the Indian electronics sector expects investments worth US$56 billion over the next four years to fulfill its goal of generating exports worth over US$80 billion by 2020.

As of August 2016, India has attracted investments from 37 mobile manufacturing companies in the  last year, creating 40,000 direct jobs and around 125,000 indirect jobs.
 
As of May 2016, out of 195 investment proposals, worth  1.21 lakh crore, the government has approved 74 applications amounting to  17,300 crores, while 27 proposals have been declined.

Foxconn, the world’s largest contract electronics manufacturer, which is based in Taiwan, has pledged investment worth $5 billion to set up R&D and electronic manufacturing facilities in India within the next five years.
In January 2015, Samsung contemplated a joint public-private initiative under which 10 "MSME-Samsung Technical Schools" will be established in India. In February, Samsung announced that it will manufacture the Samsung Z1 in its plant in Noida. In addition to mobile phones, Samsung's factories in Noida and Sriperumbudur produce appliances and consumer electronics such as refrigerators, LED televisions, washing machines, and split air conditioners.
In February 2015, Huawei opened an R&D center in Bengaluru with an investment of  million. It is also setting up a telecom hardware manufacturing plant in Chennai, which has been approved by the central government.
In February 2015, Xiaomi began initial talks with the Andhra Pradesh government to begin manufacturing smartphones at a Foxconn-run facility in Sri City. In early August 2015, the company announced that the first manufacturing unit was operational within seven months after it was conceived.
In August 2015, Lenovo commenced operations at a smartphone manufacturing plant in Sriperumbudur, near Chennai, in the Indian state of Tamil Nadu, run by the Singapore-based contract manufacturer Flextronics International Ltd. The plant has separate manufacturing lines for Lenovo and Motorola, as well as separate quality assurance and product testing functions.
Taiwan's major contract manufacturer, Wistron Corp., which makes devices for companies such as BlackBerry, HTC and Motorola, announced plans in November 2015 to manufacture the devices at a new factory in Noida, Uttar Pradesh.
The plants may become operational in 2016, each employing 3,000-3,500 people.
Phone manufacturer Vivo Mobile India began manufacturing smartphones in December 2015 at a plant in Greater Noida, employing a workforce of 2,200 people.
The US-based personal computing hardware multinational Dell Technologies ( formerly known as Dell), which in 2016 marked its twenty years of presence in India with a current strength of over 27,000 Indian employees, looks to expand its capacity to export from India, at its laptop and computer manufacturing factory in Sriperumbudur near Chennai, where it previously invested US$30 million. Dell has plans of investing in the tunes of US$300 million through its venture fund arm Dell ventures, in Indian start-ups working in cloud computing, security and analytics as well as in the manufacturing of microprocessors and photo voltaic cells. Chennai-based Munoth Industries has partnered with China's Better Power for technological support as it aims to set up India’s first of its kind Lithium-ion cell manufacturing plant in Tirupati in three phases by 2022 with an investment of  799 crores. The first phase of the project will be complete by 2019 and the latter phases by 2022. The plant is expected to generate 1,700 job opportunities. The company has invested  165 crore for the first phase, in which it would draw a capital investment of  25 crore from the Central Government under the Make In India scheme. The state government of Andhra Pradesh also  will provide fiscal and operational incentives, including subsidies on taxes and power costs. The company intends to sell finished lithium ion cells to mobile phone manufacturers and battery pack manufacturers in India.

Semiconductor industry

With the newly heralded era of the Internet of Things (IoT) dictating that the new generation of interconnected devices be capable of smart-computing, the Indian semiconductor industry is set for a stable upsurge with bright prospects provided India's generic obstacles like redtape-ism, fund crunch and infrastructural deficits are adequately addressed.

Statistics and trends
The fast growing electronics system design manufacturing ( ESDM ) industry in India has vibrant design capabilities with the number of units exceeding 120. As stated by the Department of Electronics and Information Technology (DeitY), approximately 2,000 chips are being designed in India every year with more than 20,000 engineers currently employed to work on various aspects of IC design and verification.
According to a NOVONOUS report, the consumption of semiconductors in India, mostly import-based, is estimated to rise from $10.02 billion in 2013 to $52.58 billion by 2020 at a dynamic CAGR of 26.72%. The report estimates that the consumption of mobile devices will grow at a CAGR of 33.4% between 2013 and 2020, driving the share of mobile devices in semiconductor revenue up from 35.4% in 2013 to 50.7% in 2020. Moreover, the telecom segment is also expected to rise at a CAGR of 26.8% during 2013-20.  The information technology and office automation segment are estimated to grow at a CAGR of 18.2% in the same period. The consumer electronics segment also is expected to grow at a CAGR of 18.8% over the seven years.  The automotive electronics segment is expected to grow at a 30.5% CAGR from 2013 to 2020. The EDSM industry will also grow on the back of these high consumption-led industries.  Currently, almost all the semiconductor demand is met by imports from countries like the USA, Japan, and Taiwan.  In the semiconductor sector, India has a significant human-capital pool which is currently concentrated in design, in the absence of an end-to-end manufacturing base. But the nascent ESDM segment in India is premised on competent domestic research by Indian universities and institutes across the entire semiconductor manufacturing value chain; namely, chip design and testing, embedded systems, process-related, EDA, MEMS and sensors, etc., which have contributed to a voluminous number of research publications.

Initiatives in the semiconductor industry
As of 2016, the government allows 100% FDI in the Electronics system manufacturing and design (ESDM) sector through an automatic route to attract investments including from Original Equipment Manufacturers (OEMs) and Integrated Device Manufacturers (IDMs), and those relocating to India from other countries, in addition to EMC, MIPS and other incentives and schemes provided to the electronics sector.

The Department of Electronics and Information Technology (DeitY), in line with Skill India campaign has launched an  49 crore scheme for capacity building in ESDM. In October 2015, Infineon Technologies, a German semiconductor firm partnered with National Skill Development Corporation (NSDC) to enhance skill and manpower in semiconductor technology, aimed at boosting the ESDM ecosystem in India.

The India Electronics & Semiconductor Association (IESA) has announced a SPEED UP and SCALE-UP of its talent development initiative to be implemented through the Centre of Excellence with the Electronics Sector Skills Council of India (ESSCI) and an MoU with the Visvesvaraya Technological University (VTU) and the RV-VLSI Design Center to build human capital in the ESDM field. ESSCI, which has developed over 140 Qualification Packs (QP) / National Occupation Standards (NOS) across 14 sub-sectors of which Embedded System Design and VLSI are key domains absorbing engineers, established their first-ever Centre of Excellence (CoE) at BMS college of Engineering for VLSI and embedded system design.  IESA signed an MoU with Taiwan Electrical and Electronic Manufacturers’ Association (TEEMA) to encourage co-operation in technology and knowledge transfer and investment commitment to the domestic ESDM sector that can benefit both Indian and Taiwanese companies. IESA also entered into a MoU with Singapore Semiconductor Industry Association (SSIA) in February 2015, with an objective to forge trade and technical cooperation tie-ups between the electronics and semiconductor industries of both the countries.

The Department of Electronics and Information Technology (DeitY) has established an Electronics Development Fund (EDF) managed by Canara Bank ( CANBANK Venture Capital Funds or CVCFL) to provide risk capital and to attract venture funds, angel funds and seed funds for incubating R&D and fostering the innovative environment in the sector., the establishment of “Fund of Funds for Start-ups” (FFS) approved by the union cabinet as part of the EDF for contribution to various alternative investment funds or daughter funds, registered with Securities and Exchange Board of India which would extend funding support to start-ups, in line with the Start-up India Action Plan unveiled by Government in January 2016, will be beneficial to the start-ups in the ESDM space, according to IESA.

The National Centre for Flexible Electronics (NCFlexE) at IIT Kanpur, the National Centre for Excellence in Technology for Internal Security at IIT Bombay and the Centre for Excellence for Internet of Things at NASSCOM, Bengaluru has been set up to promote the development of national capability in ESDM.

Recent notable achievements in ESDM (Electronic System Design & Manufacturing) Research and Development
In 2011, Hyderabad based semiconductor chip design services entity SoCtronics completed the first 28 nm design chip to be developed in India. Bangalore-based Indian company Navika Electronics has designed GNSS/GPS SoC (System on Chip) chipsets based on ARM core processors under its own brand name for portable applications like receiving/down conversion and amplification of GPS and Galileo signals.

The Centre for Nano Science and Engineering (CeNSE), IISc, Bengaluru, in collaboration with KAS Tech, a Bengaluru-based electronics manufacturing company, has developed 'Ocean', a highly integrated and portable  chemical vapour depositor that can commercially produce various two dimensional materials including graphene, in an easy 'plug and grow' approach which can have various novel applications in the ESDM sector, for both academia and industry alike.

In what could be viewed as a breakthrough for the country’s electric automobile programme as well as indigenous electronics manufacturing, the Indian Space Research Organization (ISRO) and the Automotive Research Association of India (ARAI) together have  developed and validated through tests, using ISRO's state of the art cell technology, a lithium ion battery prototype for application in electric vehicles and looks forward to commercialising the technology through mass production by partnering with automotive companies. Currently India's lithium ion battery requirements are completely met by import as there is no domestic manufacturing of these batteries. While the raw material for the batteries still has to be imported, the rest of the value chain can be synthesized domestically at a competitive cost, if the project clears all the barriers.
Researchers at the Indian Institute of Technology - Bombay (IIT-B), in a collaboration with ISRO’s Semi-Conductor Labs (SCL), Chandigarh, have developed an indigenous Bipolar Junction Transistor (BJT) which can function with Bi-CMOS (Bipolar Complementary Metal Oxide Semiconductor). Analogue or mixed chips based on various digital Bi-CMOS technology with integrated analogue high frequency BJT based amplifiers are essential for IoT and space applications like high frequency communications as they reduce form factor, power consumption, weight and size dimensions and cost etc.

Investments in Semiconductor Industry in India
In 2014, the ESDM industry was projected to see investment proposals worth  10,000 crores (USD $1.5 billion) over the next two years, along with five partially state-funded start-up incubation centres of the 250 planned by the industry body, as per IESA.

In February 2014, the union cabinet approved the setting up of these  fab proposals with the decision to extend incentives as follows:
 25% subsidy on capital expenditure and tax reimbursement under M-SIPS Policy.
 Exemption of Basic Customs Duty (BCD) for non-covered capital items.
 200% deduction on expenditure on R&D under Section 35(2AB) of the Income Tax Act.
 Investment-linked deductions under Section 35AD of the IT Act.
 Interest free loan of around  5,124 crore to each.

Starting January 1, 2022, the government started taking applications under its incentive scheme in developing a full ecosystem for the chip manufacturing industry and expects at least a dozen semiconductor manufacturers to start setting up local factories in the next several years.

Investments in fabrication plants in India
As of mid 2016, there were no operational commercial Semiconductor fabrication plants in India.

The Centre of Excellence in Nanoelectronics (CEN), at the Indian Institute of Technology – Bombay, has a lab-like fab facility collaborated between IIT Bombay and IISc Bangalore that offers research in the design, fabrication and characterization of traditional CMOS Nano-electronic devices, Novel Material based devices (III-V Compound Semiconductor devices, Spintronics, Opto-electronics), Micro Electromechanical Systems (MEMS), NEMS, Bio-MEMS, polymer based devices and solar Photovoltaics to researchers across academia, industry and government laboratories, all over India. The center also offers support in device fabrication technologies using sophisticated equipment under the Indian Nano Users Program (INUP) and acts as a linchpin for developing innovative technologies that can be tweaked and commercialized for spurring the nano-industrial growth in India.

A foundry for producing GaN nano material proposed to be extended around the existing facility for producing gallium nitride transistors, at the IISc’s Centre for Nano Science and Engineering (CeNSE), Bangalore, at a cost of  3000 crore has received preliminary approval from the central government.

 Gujarat is expected to be home to one of the semiconductor wafer fabrication manufacturing facility by late 2017 in Prantij of Sabarkantha district. To be set up by anchor partner Hindustan Semiconductor Manufacturing Corporation (HSMC) and copartners STMicroelectronics N.V. (France/Italy) and Silterra (Malaysia), it will employ a workforce of over 25,000 including 4,000 direct employees. The group will establish two manufacturing units at an expense of over  29,000 crore or about US$4.5 billion, each capable of producing 20,000 wafers per month. Technology nodes currently proposed by this consortium are 90, 65 and 45 nm nodes in Phase I and 45, 28 and 22 nm nodes in Phase II. In March 2016, HSMC received ₹700 crore worth of seed investment for the project from Mumbai-based private equity fund Next Orbit Ventures (NOV).

 Another consortium, led by Jaiprakash Associates in collaboration with IBM and Tower Semiconductor Ltd., proposed to build a wafer fab in Greater Noida near Yamuna Expressway in Uttar Pradesh at an expense of over  34,000 crore or about US$5 billion, capable of producing 40,000 300mm-diameter wafers per month in an advanced CMOS with 90, 65 and 45 nm CMOS nodes initially before gradually switching over to 28 nm and 22 nm CMOS nodes in later phases. As of April 2016, the fate of the project remains uncertain as to the debt-ridden lead partner, JPA, exited the project, citing the commercial infeasibility of the project.

 SunEdison and Adani Group have signed an MoU to build the largest vertically integrated solar photovoltaic fab facility in India with an investment of up to US$4 billion in Gujarat's Mundra, creating 4,500 direct jobs and more than 15,000 indirect jobs by integrating all aspects of solar panel production on site, including polysilicon refining and ingot, cell, and module production.
 The U.S.-based company called Cricket Semiconductor has evinced interest in investing US$1 billion in building an analog integrated-circuit and power supply integrated-circuit specific semiconductor fab in Madhya Pradesh.
 In 2022, International Semiconductor Consortium (ISMC), a joint venture between Abu Dhabi-based Next Orbit Ventures and Israeli company, Tower Semiconductor, announced that it had signed a memorandum of understanding (MoU) with the Government of Karnataka to set up a semiconductor chip manufacturing plant in the State. ISMC will invest $3 billion to set up the plant in Karnataka. The plant is proposed to be a 65-nanometer analog semiconductor fabrication unit, and will be the first chip manufacturing plant in India.

Miscellaneous Investments in Semiconductor Industry
 Cyient Ltd. signed an agreement to acquire a 74 per cent equity stake in Rangsons Electronics Pvt Ltd, a Mysuru-based ESDM servicing firm.
 A US-based product engineering firm, Aricent, acquired Bengaluru-based chip design services company SmartPlay US$180 million.
 Altran Technologies SA, a French technology consulting multinational, agreed to acquire SiConTech, a Bengaluru-based start-up that designs semiconductor chips.
 In August 2013, AMD opened a new ESDM design centre in HITEC City, Hyderabad, in addition to its existing design centre in Bengaluru.
 The world's largest processor intellectual property technology vendor ARM expanded its VLSI operations out of Bengaluru as it set up a new Design Centre at Noida, Uttar Pradesh for working on planar and FinFET CMOS technologies under its physical IP division.
 Taiwan based Mobile phone chipmaker Mediatek opened a VLSI and embedded software design center at Techpark in Bangalore with a plan to invest $200 million to employ up to 500 engineers over the following few years for working on mobile communications, wireless connectivity & home entertainment segments.

Critics and detractors of the fab projects currently underway in India, in different conceptual phases, doubt the prospects of success of these capital-intensive projects, pointing to various reasons like marginal profitability due to overcapacity of output in a saturated and fiercely competed fab market, noncompetence of these particular fabs in terms of cost and performance related to the dimensions of CMOS nodes even in attracting domestic end-use industries which have access to the more sophisticated fabs outside the country, cost prohibitive maintenance and upgrades needed every few years to weather obsolescence, nonavailability of domestically procurable semiconductor-grade materials in absence of complementing ancillary manufacturing industries and other resource-intensive strings attached to such projects, including land acquisition requirements, necessity uninterrupted deionised water and power supplies, supply of critical gases such as nitrogen and argon, absence of skilled labour force and drain of an already inadequate number of experienced domestic talent pool in electronic engineering and R&D possessing expertise to overcome the barriers of related sensitive technologies for mass production towards other attractive sectors in absence of a major Indian player in the electronics sector, especially in a developing country like India, which is still grappling with infrastructural bottlenecks.

However, the endorsers of the fab projects, such as AMD, which partnered with HSMC for the fab project in Gujarat, stress the strategic need of developing the fabs as part of an end-to-end electronics manufacturing base in India which imports billions of dollars worth of even lower-end semiconductor nodes of 90 nm and above each year.

Relevant circles within India have been advocating for investment by the central government with a long term strategic vision in the revolutionising fields of Gallium Nitride (GaN) and Mercury Cadmium Telluride (HgCdTe) based non silica semiconductor foundry and fab because of their wide ranged use like High Electron Mobility Transistor (HEMT) made from GaN in power electronics both for civilian and military applications which can switch at high speed and can handle high power and high temperature without needing any cooling and HgCdTe based high quality sensors for military space requirements.

See also
 Economy of India
 Foreign Direct Investment in India
 Standup India
 Make in India
 Digital India
 Skill India
 Automotive industry in India
 Semiconductor industry in Taiwan
Semiconductor industry in China

References

Electronics industry in India
Semiconductor industry by country
Semiconductors
Industries in India